Maoritomella densecostulata is a species of sea snail, a marine gastropod mollusk in the family Borsoniidae.

Description
The height of the shell attains 4.6 mm, its width 2 mm.

Distribution
This marine species occurs on the continental slope of Eastern Transkei, South Africa

References

 R.N. Kilburn, Turridae (Mollusca: Gastropoda) of southern Africa and Mozambique. Part 3. Subfamily Borsoniinae; Annals of the Natal Museum, 1986 - reference.sabinet.co.za

External links
 
  Bouchet P., Kantor Yu.I., Sysoev A. & Puillandre N. (2011) A new operational classification of the Conoidea. Journal of Molluscan Studies 77: 273–308
  Biolib.cz: Maoritomella densecostulata R.N. Kilburn, 1986

Endemic fauna of South Africa
densecostulata
Gastropods described in 1986